Area 7 may refer to:

 Area 7 (NTS) one of the areas inside the Nevada Test Site
 Area 7 (novel), thriller by Matthew Reilly 
 Area-7, Australian band
 Brodmann area 7

See also 
 District 7 (disambiguation)
 Sector 7 (disambiguation)